The Hortonville Community Hall is located in Hortonville, Wisconsin.

History
The uses of the building have included as a meeting hall, dance hall and opera house. It was listed on the National Register of Historic Places in 1981 and on the State Register of Historic Places in 1989.

References

Opera houses on the National Register of Historic Places in Wisconsin
National Register of Historic Places in Outagamie County, Wisconsin
Spanish Colonial Revival architecture in Wisconsin
Brick buildings and structures
Buildings and structures completed in 1912